Brandon Curran (born October 13, 1980 in Papillion, Nebraska) is an American soccer defender, who currently plays for the Charleston Battery of the USL First Division.

Curran attended UMass Lowell, playing on the men's soccer team from 1999 to 2002.  He was a 2002 second team All American and finished his career ranked seventh on the school's all-time points list.  He graduated in 2003.  He was inducted into the UMass Lowell Athletic Hall of Fame in 2008.  Curran began playing for the Worcester Kings of the USL Professional Development League (PDL) in 2002 between his Junior and Senior year of college and then signed a professional contract with the  New Hampshire Phantoms of the USL Second Division in 2003 at the end of his college career.  In 2004, he played a handful of games on trial with the New England Revolution.  In 2005, he was a second team All Star.  In April 2006, Curran signed with the Charleston Battery of the USL First Division; started 32 games and completed the season as the player with the most minutes played.  In 2008, he went on loan for five games with the Wilmington Hammerheads of the USL Second Division.

Coach
In 2003, Curran became an assistant coach with UMass Lowell.

References

External links
 Charleston Battery stats

1980 births
Living people
American soccer players
UMass Lowell River Hawks men's soccer players
Seacoast United Phantoms players
USL Second Division players
USL First Division players
Charleston Battery players
Wilmington Hammerheads FC players
Worcester Kings players
Soccer players from Nebraska
People from Papillion, Nebraska
Association football defenders